Browns may refer to:
 Shades of brown of the color brown

Places
In the United States
 Browns, Alabama, an unincorporated community 
 Browns, Illinois, a village 
 Browns, Boone County, Missouri, an unincorporated community
 Browns, Scott County, Missouri, an unincorporated community
 Browns, Ohio, an unincorporated community 
 Browns Lake (disambiguation)

Elsewhere
 Browns, New Zealand, a village in New Zealand's Southland Region

Sports
 Cleveland Browns, a National Football League team based in Cleveland, Ohio
 Cleveland Browns (baseball), a Negro league baseball team
 St. Louis Browns, a former Major League Baseball team now known as the Baltimore Orioles
 Enterprise Browns, defunct Minor league baseball team

Other
 Browns (fashion boutique), a shop in Mayfair, London
 Browns of Chester, a department store in Chester, England
 Browns of York, a department store in York, England
 The Browns, a country music group of the 1950s and '60s
 The 5 Browns, a piano quintet of 5 siblings
 Satyrinae, a subfamily of butterflies commonly called the browns
 Edward and Elaine Brown, tax protesters
 The Browns, a comedy web series starring Tammie Brown

See also
 
 
 Brown (disambiguation)
 Browning (disambiguation)